Cladospongia is a genus of choanoflagellate. The type species (C. elegans) is found in India (Madras).

References

External links 

 Cladospongia at AlgaeBase

Species described in 1940
Craspedida